Baden-Württemberg International, agency for international economic and scientific cooperation (BW_i), based in Stuttgart, is the centre of competence of the German state of Baden-Württemberg for the internationalisation of business and science. BW_i is responsible for supporting Baden-Württemberg companies in opening up foreign markets and optimally positioning the southwest German business and science location.

History 
BW_i was established as the "Baden-Württemberg Export Foundation" by the former Prime Minister of Baden-Württemberg Lothar Späth (CDU) in 1984 to support companies in opening up foreign markets. The transfer of the business activity into the legal form of a GmbH took place in 1990. Since 2004, the company has operated under the name Baden-Württemberg International, agency for international economic and scientific cooperation.

Responsibilities 
As Baden-Württemberg's centre of excellence for the internationalisation of business and science, the company supports domestic and foreign companies and clusters, research institutions and universities, as well as regions and municipalities in their internationalisation efforts. In addition, the state company supports Baden-Württemberg companies in opening up foreign markets.

Shareholders 
 State of Baden-Württemberg
 L-Bank, Landeskreditbank Baden-Württemberg
 Federation of Industry of the State of Baden-Württemberg 
 Association of Chambers of Commerce and Industry of Baden-Württemberg
 Baden-Württembergischer Handwerkstag

Committees

Supervisory Board 
 Petra Olschowski, Minister of Science, Research and Arts of Baden-Württemberg (Chairwoman)
 Dr. Nicole Hoffmeister-Kraut, Ministry of Economic Affairs, Labour and Tourism of Baden-Württemberg (Deputy Chairwoman)

Advisory board 
 Ulrich Dietz, Chairman of the Administrative Board GFT Technologies SE, Business Advisory Board (Chairman) 
 Prof. Dr. Wolfram Ressel, Rector of the University of Stuttgart, Advisory Board for Science, Research and Arts (Chairman)

Foreign subsidiary 
 Baden-Württemberg Economic and Scientific Cooperation (Nanjing) Co., Ltd., China

References

External links 
 Website Baden-Württemberg International (English)
 Website Baden-Württemberg International Economic and Scientific Cooperation - Nanjing (English)

Economy of Baden-Württemberg